Eugénie Sellers Strong  (née Sellers; 25 March 1860 – 16 September 1943) was a British archaeologist and art historian. She was Assistant Director of the British School at Rome from 1909 to 1925. After studying at Girton College, Cambridge, in 1890 she became the first female student admitted to the British School at Athens; she continued art historical studies in Germany under Adolf Furtwängler. In 1897 she married art historian Sandford Arthur Strong. She contributed to the catalogue of the 1903 Burlington Fine Arts Club "Greek Art" Exhibition, and wrote several books on classical art and sculpture.

Early life
Eugénie Sellers was born in London on 25 March 1860 to Fredrick William Sellers, a wine merchant, and his wife Anna (née Oates). Her French mother was of aristocratic descent (her maternal great-grandfather was the baron du Cluseau) and Eugénie was baptized in the church of St Roch in Paris. She had one sister, Charlotte, eight years younger than herself. Though her family lived primarily in London, they travelled extensively in Europe and she first attended school with Jesuit fathers in Valladolid, Spain. She subsequently attended a convent school at Dourdan in France, leaving in 1877 to travel with her family in Italy and Greece.

Both of her parents had died before Sellers matriculated at Girton College, Cambridge in 1879, where she read for the Classics Tripos.  However, although she was permitted to take the Tripos, at this time, Cambridge degrees were not awarded to women.

Academic career
On leaving Cambridge, Eugénie took up a teaching post at St Leonards School in St Andrews, Scotland and a year later moved on to London, where she studied under Sir Charles Newton the British Museum  The faculty at the University of St Andrews awarded her an honorary degree after publication of her first book. She was the first female student admitted to the British School at Athens, studying there in 1890-91. Her translation of an account of the excavation of Troy, from the German version of Carl Schuchhardt, was published in English in 1891. She continued art historical studies in Munich under Adolf Furtwängler and Ludwig Traube.

In 1897 she married art historian Sandford Arthur Strong. Her husband was librarian and curator for the Duke of Devonshire at Chatsworth House from 1895. They had no children. After her husband died in 1904, Strong continued in his post at Chatsworth until the death of the 8th Duke of Devonshire in 1908.

In 1906 she was appointed a corresponding member of the Imperial German Archaeological Institute (Kaiserlich-Deutsches Archäologisches Institut).

Strong contributed to the catalogue of the 1903 Burlington Fine Arts Club "Greek Art" Exhibition, and wrote several books on classical art and sculpture. She wrote two chapters for the Cambridge Ancient History, on "The art of the Roman republic" and "The art of the Augustan age".

Strong became a life research fellow at Girton College in 1910. She was Assistant Director of the British School at Rome from 1909 to 1925.  She continued to live at a flat on the via Balbo, near the Basilica of Santa Maria Maggiore in Rome, until her death in 1943, leaving an unpublished manuscript on the history of the Vatican Palace. She died in a nursing home, and was buried in the Campo Verano cemetery in Rome.

In England, she became a Commander of the Order of the British Empire in 1927, and the British Academy awarded her its Serena medal for Italian studies in 1938. She gave the Rhind Lectures in 1920, on Painting in the Roman Empire (from the last century of the Republic to about 800 AD).

In Italy, she was elected as a member of the Lincean Academy, the Pontifical Academy of Archaeology, and the Society of the Arcadians. She supported the archaeological policies of supporters of Benito Mussolini, and was awarded the gold medal of the city of Rome in 1938.

Selected works
All works were authored by Eugénie Sellers Strong unless otherwise noted.
 (1895) Masterpieces of Greek Sculpture: A Series of Essays on the History of Art Adolf Furtwängler, Eugenie Strong (editor and translator)   (a translation by Strong of Furtwängler's Meisterwerke der griechischen Plastik)
 (1907) Roman Sculpture from Augustus to Constantine 
 (1915) Apotheosis and after life: three lectures on certain phases of art and religion in the Roman Empire 
 (1929) Art in Ancient Rome (Ars una: species mille. General history of art)

References

Bibliography
Dyson, S. L. 2004. Eugénie Sellers Strong: Portrait of an Archaeologist 
Scott Thomson, G. 1949. Mrs. Arthur Strong: A Memoir 
Toynbee, J. M. C. 2004. Strong [nee Sellers], Eugenie (1860–1943). rev. Stephen Dyson. Oxford Dictionary of National Biography [Online]. http://www.oxforddnb.com/view/article/36352.
 http://arthistorians.info/stronges

External links
 

1860 births
1943 deaths
British archaeologists
British art historians
Alumni of Girton College, Cambridge
Women art historians
British women historians
British women archaeologists
Steamboat ladies